Hardtop is a rigid automobile roof.

Hardtop may also refer to:

Hardtop (Transformers), a Transformers character
Hardtop (G.I. Joe), a fictional character in the G.I. Joe universe
Donny "Hardtop" Brooks, a character from COPS (animated TV series)